The canton of Charny Orée de Puisaye (before 2021: canton of Charny) is an administrative division of the Yonne department, central France. Its borders were modified at the French canton reorganisation which came into effect in March 2015. Its seat is in Charny-Orée-de-Puisaye.

It consists of the following communes:
 
Chamvres
Charny-Orée-de-Puisaye
Chassy
La Ferté-Loupière
Fleury-la-Vallée
Merry-la-Vallée
Montholon
Les Ormes
Paroy-sur-Tholon
Poilly-sur-Tholon
Saint-Maurice-le-Vieil
Saint-Maurice-Thizouaille
Senan
Sépeaux-Saint-Romain
Sommecaise
Le Val-d'Ocre
Valravillon

References

Cantons of Yonne